Miguel Ángel Llera Bello (born 30 January 1948) is a Mexican physician and politician affiliated with the National Action Party. He served as Deputy of the LIX Legislature of the Mexican Congress representing Veracruz.

References

1948 births
Living people
Politicians from Veracruz
20th-century Mexican physicians
National Action Party (Mexico) politicians
Universidad Veracruzana alumni
Academic staff of Universidad Veracruzana
Deputies of the LIX Legislature of Mexico
Members of the Chamber of Deputies (Mexico) for Veracruz